John Prescott is an American politician. He serves as a Republican member for the 33rd district of the Indiana House of Representatives.

In 2018, Prescott was elected for the 33rd district of the Indiana House of Representatives, assuming office on November 7, 2018.

References 

Living people
Place of birth missing (living people)
Year of birth missing (living people)
Republican Party members of the Indiana House of Representatives
21st-century American politicians